The Massachusetts Department of Elementary and Secondary Education (DESE), sometimes referred to as the Massachusetts Department of Education, is the state education agency for the Commonwealth of Massachusetts, identified by the U.S. Department of Education. It is responsible for public education at the elementary and secondary levels. The agency has its headquarters in Malden. It is governed by the Massachusetts Board of Education.

Early Childhood Resource Centers in Massachusetts 
The program started in 1991 by the Early Education Department, who still runs and funds this grant today. The purpose of these centers is to facilitate the availability and accessibility of early childhood materials and resources statewide. Partnering with libraries has enabled broader access for parents, schools, child care agencies, and other entities involved with early education care and intervention.

These Resource Centers provide education materials that range from professional resource books, parenting books, videos & DVDs, teaching curriculum kits, themed picture books, big books, and many other items that are available for borrowing at no charge. Throughout the school year there are also teacher trainings available where professionals can earn early education credits or professional development hours. These trainings vary by location, so please contact the specific location with inquiries.

As of 2017, the Cambridge, Falmouth, Haverhill, Norfolk, and Springfield Public Library are the five Early Childhood Resource Centers in Massachusetts.

See also
Massachusetts Board of Education
Massachusetts Tests for Educator Licensure
List of high schools in Massachusetts

Notes and references

External links
Official website
Early Childhood Resource Centers
 . (Various documents related to Department of Elementary and Secondary Education).

 
Massachusetts
Elementary and Secondary Education
School accreditors
1789 establishments in Massachusetts